Route nationale 43 (RN 43) is a secondary highway in Madagascar of 133 km, running from Analavory to the intersection with RN 7. It crosses the region of Vakinankaratra and Itasy.

It has recently been repaved.

Selected locations on route
(north to south)
Analavory - (intersection with RN 1 from Antananarivo, near Sambaina)
Ampefy 
Soavinandriana
Ambohibary - (intersection with RN 7)

See also
List of roads in Madagascar
Transport in Madagascar

References

Roads in Itasy Region
Roads in Vakinankaratra
Roads in Madagascar